Leonard Perry Scott Jr. (August 27, 1917 – April 4, 1988) was an American football player and coach. He played college football for Muhlenberg from 1937 to 1940 and professional football for the Detroit Lions in 1942 and the Bethlehem Bulldogs from 1947 to 1949. After his playing career ended, he coached high school football in Allentown, Pennsylvania.

Early years
Scott was born in 1917 at East Orange, New Jersey. He attended Bernards School in Bernardsville, New Jersey. He then played college football at Muhlenberg College from 1937 to 1940.

Professional football and military service
He was selected by the Detroit Lions with the 135th pick of the 1941 NFL Draft. He appeared in seven NFL games as an end and tackle for the Lions during the 1942 season. 

Scott served in the Army Air Corps during World War II. During the war, he flew B-24 bombers. He flew 31 combat missions in Europe and attained the rank of major. After the war, he played professional football in the American Football League as an end for the Bethlehem Bulldogs from 1947 to 1949.

Later years
Scott married Emma V. Marsden in 1951. He worked as a history teach and football coach at Allen High School in Allentown, Pennsylvania, from 1948 until his retirement. He died in 1988 at Lehigh Valley Hospital in Allentown.

References

1917 births
1988 deaths
People from East Orange, New Jersey
Muhlenberg Mules football players
Detroit Lions players
Players of American football from New Jersey
American football ends